Ongkharak is a district (amphoe) in the western part of Nakhon Nayok province, central Thailand.

Once King Chulalongkorn (Rama V) visited Mueang Nakhon Nayok. When he and his company arrived the area of Ongkharak District, one of the royal guard fell ill and died. The king ordered a shrine built to commemorate his servant. Ongkharak means 'royal guard'.

History
The old district office of Ongkharak was in Tambon Bang O (now in Ban Na district). In 1889 King Chulalongkorn ordered the building of the Rangsit Canal, a canal that links the Chao Phraya and Nakhon Nayok Rivers. The water gate in the Chao Phraya River was named Chulalongkorn Water Gate (ประตูน้ำจุฬาลงกรณ์), and its corresponding gate in the Nakhon Nayok River was named Saovabha Bhongsi Water Gate (ประตูน้ำเสาวภาผ่องศรี). The district office was moved near the 16th Khlong of Khlong Rangsit. Twenty years later, the office moved to a place next to the Saovabha Bhongsi Water Gate. Now the district office is behind Saovabha Market, 500 m from the old office.

Geography
Neighboring districts are (from the northeast clockwise): Ban Na and Mueang Nakhon Nayok of Nakhon Nayok Province; Ban Sang of Prachinburi province; Bang Nam Priao of Chachoengsao province; Lam Luk Ka, Thanyaburi, and Nong Suea of Pathum Thani province.

The important water resources are the Nakhon Nayok River and Khlong Rangsit.

Education
Srinakharinwirot University's, Ongkharak campus is in the district.

Administration
The district is divided into 11 sub-districts (tambons), which are further subdivided into 116 villages (mubans). The township (thesaban tambon) Ongkharak covers parts of tambons Ongkharak and Sai Mun. There are a further 11 tambon administrative organizations (TAO).

External links
 Ongkharak district history(Thai)

Ongkharak